Antispila ampelopsifoliella is a species of moth of the  family Heliozelidae. It is found in eastern North America, including Connecticut, Kentucky, New York, Vermont and Ontario.Records from Italy may refer to Antispila oinophylla.

The larvae feed on Parthenocissus quinquefolia. They mine the leaves of their host plant. The mine starts with a relatively long contorted gallery with thin broken frass, or when it runs along margin in a straighter course, later abruptly enlarged into elongate blotch or wide gallery. Here, the frass is dispersed in the  middle. The early narrow gallery may be as long as the elongate blotch. The mine can be found in any part of the leaf. The larvae are yellowish white with a black head.

Taxonomy
Previously confused with Antispila oinophylla

References

Moths described in 1874
Heliozelidae
Moths of Europe